This page refers to sports broadcasting contracts in Romania. For a list of broadcasting rights in other countries, see Sports television broadcast contracts.

Football

International competitions

FIFA World Cup: TVR in 2022
UEFA European Championship: Pro TV (2016-2028)
Romania national team: Antena 1 (2022-2028) & Prima TV (2022-2026)
UEFA European Qualifiers: Antena 1 (2022-2028) & Prima TV (2022-2026) (only Romanian team), Digi Sport & Prima Sport (2021-2024) (all matches, except Romanian team)
UEFA Nations League: Antena 1 (only Romanian team, the finals from 2023 and 2027, highlights) (2022-2027) & Prima TV (only Romanian team, the final from 2025, highlights) (2022-2025), Digi Sport & Prima Sport (2022-2023) (all matches, except Romanian team)
CONMEBOL–UEFA Cup of Champions: Digi Sport & Prima Sport in 2022
FIFA Club World Cup:  No announcement about 2023 onwards
UEFA Champions League: Digi Sport (2018-2024), Orange Sport (2010-2024), Prima Sport (2018-2024)
UEFA Europa League: Pro TV, Pro Arena & VOYO.ro (2021-2024)
UEFA Europa Conference League: Pro TV, Pro Arena & VOYO.ro (2021-2024)
UEFA Super Cup: Digi Sport (2019-2023), Orange Sport (2011-2023), Prima Sport (2018-2023)

Youth competitions

FIFA U-20 World Cup: TBD for 2023
FIFA U-17 World Cup: TBD for 2023
FIFA Youth Cup: FIFA+
UEFA European Under-21 Championship: TVR in 2023
Romania national U-21 team: Pro Arena
Romania national U-20 team: Digi Sport
Germany national U-21 team: YouTube
Germany national U-20 team: YouTube
Germany national youth football teams: YouTube
UEFA European Under-19 Championship: TVR & UEFA.tv in 2022
UEFA European Under-17 Championship: UEFA.tv
UEFA Youth League: Digi Sport (2018-2024), Orange Sport (2018-2024), Prima Sport (2018-2024), UEFA.tv (2021-2024)
Under-20 Intercontinental Cup: UEFA.tv in 2022

Romania

Superliga: Digi Sport (2009-2024), Orange Sport (2011-2024), Prima Sport (2015-2024)
Liga II: Digi Sport (2011-2024), Orange Sport (2015-2024), Prima Sport (2018-2024)
Cupa României: Digi Sport (2012-2024), Orange Sport (2015-2024), Prima Sport (2018-2024)
Supercupa României: Digi Sport (2016-2023), Orange Sport (2019-2023), Prima Sport (2019-2023)

Spain 
La Liga Santander: Digi Sport (2009-2024), Orange Sport (2015-2026), Prima Sport (2019-2026)
La Liga Smartbank: Digi Sport (2021-2024), Orange Sport (2021-2026), Prima Sport (2021-2026)
Copa del Rey: Digi Sport
Spanish Super Cup: Digi Sport

England

Premier League: Digi Sport (2022-2025), Orange Sport (2022-2025), Prima Sport (2022-2025)
FA Cup: Pro Arena & VOYO.ro (2021-2024)
FA Community Shield: Pro Arena & VOYO.ro (2022 & 2023)
EFL Cup: Digi Sport (2019-2024)

Italy 
Serie A: Digi Sport (2009-2024), Orange Sport (2018-2024), Prima Sport (2019-2024)  
Serie B: AntenaPLAY (2022-2023)
Coppa Italia: No announcement about 2022 onwards
Supercoppa Italiana: No announcement about 2022 onwards

Germany

Bundesliga: Digi Sport (2018-2025), Orange Sport (2023-2025), Prima Sport (2019-2025)
DFB-Pokal: No announcement about 2022 onwards
DFL-Supercup: Digi Sport (2018-2024), Prima Sport (2019-2024)
2. Bundesliga: Digi Sport (2018-2025), Prima Sport (2021-2025)
3. Liga: YouTube

France

Ligue 1: Digi Sport (2010-2024), Orange Sport (2023-2024), Prima Sport (2019-2024)
Coupe de France: AntenaPLAY (2022-2023)
Trophée des Champions: No announcement about 2019 onwards

Scotland
Scottish Premiership: Digi Sport (2022-2023)
Scottish League Cup: Digi Sport (2022-2023)
Scottish Challenge Cup: Digi Sport (2022-2023)

Portugal
Primeira Liga: Prima Sport (2018-2023)
Taça da Liga: AntenaPLAY (2022-2023)

Saudi Arabia
Saudi Professional League: Sport Extra (2022-2023)
Saudi Super Cup: Sport Extra

Other domestic leagues and cups
Süper Lig: Prima Sport (2018-2024)
Belgian First Division A: Prima Sport (2019-2025)
Eredivisie: Sport Extra (2022-2023)
Russian Premier League: YouTube (pay-streaming)
Allsvenskan: Eurosport Player

Women's competitions
FIFA Women's World Cup: TVR in 2023
UEFA Women's Championship: UEFA.tv in 2022
FIFA U-20 Women's World Cup: TVR & EurovisionSports.tv in 2022
FIFA U-17 Women's World Cup: TVR & EurovisionSports.tv in 2022
UEFA Women's Under-19 Championship: UEFA.tv
UEFA Women's Under-17 Championship: UEFA.tv
Romania women's national team: Pro Arena
Liga I: Pro Arena (2022-2025) & FRF.tv
UEFA Women's Champions League: DAZN (2021-2025, all matches), YouTube (2021-2023, all matches) (2023-2025, 19 matches)
Women's Super League: DAZN
Liga F: DAZN

Multi-disciplines events
Olympic Games: TVR & Eurosport (2018-2032)
Summer Paralympic Games: Prima Sport in 2021
European Games: TVR in 2019
European Championships: TVR, Prima Sport, Eurosport, Eurovisionsports.tv & ETTU TV in 2022
Universiade: Eurosport
Jeux de la Francophonie: TVR
Youth Olympic Games: Eurosport

Aquatics
FINA World Aquatics Championships: TVR & Eurovisionsports.tv in 2022
FINA World Swimming Championships (25 m): Antena 1 & AntenaPLAY in 2022
LEN European Aquatics Championships: TVR & LEN TV in 2022
FINA World Junior Swimming Championships: Eurovisionsports.tv & VOYO.ro in 2022
FINA Water Polo World League: EurovisionSports.tv
European Water Polo Championship: LEN TV & VOYO.ro (only Romanian teams) in 2022
Romania men's national water polo team: Prima Sport
LEN Champions League: Sport Extra, EurovisionSports.tv
Romanian Superliga: Prima Sport
Nordic Swim Tour: Eurosport
International Swimming League: Eurosport

Archery
Archery World Cup: Eurosport

Athletics
IAAF World Championships in Athletics: Eurosport in 2023
IAAF World Indoor Championships in Athletics: No announcement about 2022 onwards
IAAF Diamond League: No announcement about 2020 onwards
European Athletics Championships: TVR & Eurovisionsports.tv in 2022
European Athletics Indoor Championships: No announcement about 2023 onwards
European Athletics Youth Championships: Eurosport
Paris Marathon: Eurosport
New York City Marathon: Eurosport
Amsterdam Marathon: Eurosport
World Athletics Continental Tour: Prima Sport

Basketball
FIBA Basketball World Cup: No announcement about 2019 onwards
FIBA Women's Basketball World Cup: Courtside1891 in 2022
EuroBasket: Courtside1891 in 2022
EuroBasket Women: No announcement about 2019 onwards
Romania national basketball team: Digi Sport
Romania women's national basketball team: TVR
Romanian league: Digi Sport, Prima Sport
Romanian Basketball Cup: Digi Sport, Prima Sport
Romanian Basketball Supercup: Digi Sport, Prima Sport
EuroLeague: EuroLeagueTV (all matches of all rounds)
EuroCup: Prima Sport (only the matches of U-BT Cluj-Napoca), EuroLeagueTV (all matches of all rounds)
Basketball Champions League: YouTube
FIBA Europe Cup: Digi Sport (only the matches of CSM CSU Oradea), Metropola TV (only the matches of CSO Voluntari), YouTube
NBA: Orange Sport (2010-2023)
Liga ACB: Sport Extra until 2024
Copa del Rey de Baloncesto: Sport Extra until 2024
Supercopa de España de Baloncesto: Sport Extra until 2024
LNB Pro A: Sport Extra

Beach soccer
FIFA Beach Soccer World Cup: EurovisionSports.tv
Euro Beach Soccer League: Recast

Boxing
AIBA World Boxing Championships: Eurosport
Dream Boxing: DAZN

Canoeing
European Canoe Slalom Championships: Eurosport
Canoe Sprint European Championships: TVR in 2022
Canoe World Cup: Eurosport

Climbing
IFSC Climbing World Championships: Eurosport
IFSC Climbing World Cup: Eurosport

Cycling
Tour de France: Eurosport
Giro d'Italia: Eurosport
Vuelta a España: Eurosport
UCI World Tour: Eurosport
Cycling Tour of Sibiu: Digi Sport
UCI Continental Circuits: Eurosport, Digi Sport
UCI Women's WorldTour: Eurosport
London Nocturne: Eurosport
British National Road Race Championships: Eurosport
French National Road Race Championships: Eurosport
Tour de l'Avenir: Eurosport
UEC European Track Championships: Eurosport
Revolution: Eurosport
UCI World Championships: Eurosport
European Road Championships: Eurosport
Tour of Romania: Sport Extra
UCI Women's World Tour: Eurosport

Darts
WDF World Darts Championship: Eurosport

Equestrianism
FEI World Equestrian Games: Eurosport
European Dressage Championship: Eurosport
European Eventing Championship: Eurosport
European Show Jumping Championships: Eurosport
Global Champions Tour: Eurosport
Belmont Stakes: Eurosport
Ascot Racecourse: Eurosport
Prix de Diane: Eurosport

Fencing
World Fencing Championships: Eurosport
European Fencing Championships: Eurosport
Fencing World Cup: Eurosport

Futsal
FIFA Futsal World Cup: EurovisionSports.tv in 2021
UEFA Futsal Championship: UEFA.tv in 2022
UEFA Futsal Champions League: Digi Sport, Orange Sport, Prima Sport
UEFA Under-19 Futsal Championship: TVR (only Romanian team) & UEFA.tv in 2022
UEFA Women's Futsal Championship: TVR & UEFA.tv in 2022
Futsal Finalissima: UEFA.tv in 2022
Liga I: Digi Sport

Gymnastics
World Artistic Gymnastics Championships: YouTube in 2022
World Rhythmic Gymnastics Championships: TVR
European Men's Artistic Gymnastics Championships: Prima Sport in 2022
European Women's Artistic Gymnastics Championships: Prima Sport in 2022
Rhythmic Gymnastics European Championships: Prima Sport
Romanian Gymnastics National Championships: Digi Sport
Artistic Gymnastics World Cup: Digi Sport
Rhythmic Gymnastics Grand Prix Series: TVR

Handball
World Men's Handball Championship: Digi Sport, Prima Sport until 2023
World Women's Handball Championship: Digi Sport, Orange Sport, Prima Sport until 2023
European Men's Handball Championship: Digi Sport, Orange Sport, Prima Sport until 2024
European Women's Handball Championship: Digi Sport, Prima Sport until 2024
Romania men's national handball team: Pro Arena until 2026
Romania women's national handball team: Pro Arena until 2026
EHF Champions League: Digi Sport, Orange Sport, Prima Sport until 2025
EHF European League: Digi Sport, Orange Sport, Prima Sport until 2025
EHF European Cup: Digi Sport, Orange Sport, Prima Sport until 2025
Women's EHF Champions League: Digi Sport, Orange Sport, Prima Sport until 2025
Women's EHF European League: Digi Sport, Orange Sport, Prima Sport until 2025
Women's EHF European Cup: Digi Sport, Orange Sport, Prima Sport until 2025
Liga Națională (men's handball): Pro Arena until 2026
Liga Naţională (women's handball): Pro Arena until 2026

Ice hockey
NHL: ESPNPlayer
Ice Hockey World Championships: YouTube
World Championship Division I: AntenaPLAY
Champions Hockey League: YouTube
National League: Sport Extra

Judo
World Judo Championships: Eurosport
European Judo Championships: Digi Sport

Kickboxing
Colosseum Tournament: Digi Sport, FightBox
Dynamite Fighting Show: Pro Arena, Sport Extra 
Enfusion: FightBox
Glory: AntenaPLAY
Golden Fighter Championship: Pro Arena, FightBox
King of Kings: FightBox & DAZN: (October 2022 to October 2025, all fights)
KO Masters: Digi Sport 
ONE Championship: Sport Extra
OSS Fighters: Digi Sport, Dotto TV
Prometheus Fighting Promotion: Digi Sport, FightBox 
World Lethwei Championship: Sport Extra

Mixed Martial Arts
UFC: Pro Arena & VOYO.ro
Bellator MMA: Sport Extra
Bushido MMA: DAZN
Heroes Fight League: Antena 1
ONE Championship: Sport Extra
Professional Fighters League: Sport Extra, VOYO.ro 
Real Xtreme Fighting: Sport Extra, FightBox
UAE Warriors: Sport Extra
UCMMA: Sport Extra
Hard Knocks Fighting: FightBox
We Love MMA: FightBox

Motor sport
Formula One: Digi Sport & Prima Sport until 2023
Formula Two: Digi Sport & Prima Sport until 2023
Formula Three: Digi Sport & Prima Sport until 2023
Porsche Supercup: Digi Sport & Prima Sport until 2023, Eurosport
Formula E: Eurosport
World Rally Championship: Orange Sport
MotoGP: Digi Sport & Prima Sport until 2023
World Touring Car Cup: Eurosport
24 Hours of Le Mans: Eurosport
Superbike World Championship: Eurosport
Dakar Rally: Eurosport
British Superbike Championship: Eurosport
Motocross World Championship: Eurosport
Extreme E: Eurosport & DAZN
GT World Challenge America: Sport Extra
GT World Challenge Europe: Sport Extra
European Le Mans Series: Sport Extra
IndyCar Series: Sport Extra
NASCAR: Sport Extra
DTM: Sport Extra
Supercars Championship: Sport Extra
Speedway Euro Championship: AntenaPLAY

Rowing
World Rowing Championships: Prima Sport in 2022
World Rowing Cup: Prima Sport
European Rowing Championships: TVR in 2022

Rugby Union
Rugby World Cup: TVR in 2019
Women's Rugby World Cup: Digi Sport in 2022
Six Nations: Orange Sport in 2023
European Rugby Champions Cup: Digi Sport & Prima Sport
European Rugby Challenge Cup: EPCR TV
The Rugby Championship: SanzaarRugbyTV
Super Rugby: SanzaarRugbyTV
Romania national rugby union team: Prima Sport
Rugby Europe International Championships: TVR (only Romanian national team matches)
Liga Națională de Rugby: Prima Sport
Cupa României: Prima Sport

Snooker
World Snooker Championships: Eurosport
UK Championship: Eurosport
Masters: Eurosport
World Cup: Eurosport
Riga Masters: Eurosport
World Open: Eurosport
Shanghai Masters: Eurosport
European Masters: Eurosport
International Championship: Eurosport
German Masters: Eurosport
Welsh Open: Eurosport
English Open: Eurosport
Scottish Open: Eurosport
Irish Open: Eurosport
Gibraltar Open: Eurosport
China Open: Eurosport
Tour Championship: AntenaPLAY
Liga Națională de Snooker: Realitatea Sportivă

Table tennis
World Table Tennis Championships: Eurosport
European Table Tennis Championships: TVR & ETTU TV in 2022
Table Tennis European Youth Championships: TVR
ITTF World Tour: Eurosport

Tennis
Australian Open: Eurosport (1995-2031)
French Open: Eurosport (1989-2026)
Wimbledon: Eurosport (2017-2023)
US Open: Eurosport (2001-2027)
Sibiu Open: Digi Sport
Davis Cup: Digi Sport & Prima Sport (only Romanian team)
Fed Cup: Digi Sport & Prima Sport
Laver Cup: Eurosport (2019-2030)
United Cup: Sport Extra
ATP Finals: Eurosport (2020-2023)
Next Gen ATP Finals: Eurosport (2020-2023)
ATP Tour Masters 1000: Eurosport (2020-2023)
ATP Tour 500: Eurosport (2020-2023)
ATP Tour 250: Eurosport (2020-2023), Prima Sport
WTA Tour: Digi Sport until 2023
ITF Men's Circuit: Digi Sport
World Tennis League: AntenaPLAY

Volleyball
FIVB Volleyball Men's World Championship: No announcement about 2018 onwards
FIVB Volleyball Women's World Championship: No announcement about 2018 onwards
Men's European Volleyball Championship: Orange Sport
Women's European Volleyball Championship: Orange Sport
CEV Champions League: Digi Sport
CEV Women's Champions League: Digi Sport
CEV Women's Challenge Cup: Digi Sport
Divizia A1 (Volei Masculin): TVR
Divizia A1 (Volei Feminin): TVR

Weightlifting
World Weightlifting Championships: No announcement about 2021 onwards
European Weightlifting Championships: Eurosport

Winter Sports
FIS Alpine Ski World Cup: Eurosport
Biathlon World Cup: Eurosport
FIS Ski Jumping World Cup: Eurosport
FIS Nordic Combined World Cup: Eurosport
FIS Cross-Country World Cup: Eurosport
FIS Freestyle Skiing World Cup: Eurosport
FIS Snowboard World Cup: Eurosport
World Figure Skating Championships: Eurosport, TVR, AntenaPLAY
European Figure Skating Championships: Eurosport, TVR
Four Continents Figure Skating Championships: TVR
ISU Grand Prix of Figure Skating: Eurosport
Biathlon European Championships: Eurosport
World Curling Championships: Eurosport
European Curling Championships: Eurosport
FIS Ski Jumping Grand Prix: Eurosport

Wrestling
World Wrestling Championships: Eurosport
European Wrestling Championships: Eurosport
NEW: FightBox
UKW Showdown: FightBox

Yachting
America's Cup: TVR2
The Ocean Race: Eurosport

References

Romania
Television in Romania